KZCH (96.3 FM), also known as "Channel 963," is a Mainstream Top 40 radio station serving the Wichita area. The iHeartMedia, Inc. outlet broadcasts with an ERP of 50 kW and is licensed to Derby, Kansas.  Its studios are located on East Douglas Avenue in Downtown Wichita, and the transmitter is just north of downtown.

History
KZCH signed on in 1978 at 95.9 MHz, and initially aired a Top 40 format as KDRB, "K-96", which had studios located in its city of license (Derby), and a transmitter near Haysville. In 1980, KDRB flipped to country as KGCS. In 1983, KGCS flipped to a country/adult contemporary hybrid as KYMG-FM, "Magic 96", which would then change calls to KAKZ. A year later, the station flipped to an automated oldies format, but would revert to AC the following year as KRZZ. The station flipped to its long-running classic rock format in the summer of 1986. To improve their coverage area, in 1987, KRZZ relocated its transmitter to a location near I-235 and South Broadway in south Wichita, which would then be changed to another location near I-135 and 21st Street in north Wichita. The station would also increase its signal strength to 50,000 watts, and relocate to 96.3 MHz, in early 1991.

On June 15, 2004, at Midnight, KRZZ dropped its 18-year-old format and began stunting with a loop redirecting KRZZ listeners to 107.3 FM, and to listen for the debut of a new format on 96.3 at 3 p.m. on June 17. At that time, 96.3 adopted KKRD's heritage Top 40/CHR format, and rebranded as "Channel 963". The current KZCH calls were adopted on June 28.

When the station began, the station leaned heavily on rhythmic material. In 2006, the station readjusted towards a more mainstream direction. In 2009, the station would lean rhythmic again, and also mixed in old school. The move was to counter Rhythmic Top 40 rival KDGS, who is the lone Rhythmic CHR station in the market. As of Summer 2022, the station would again lean rhythmic.

KZCH, along with other iHeartRadio stations, partner with KSNW when tornado warnings are issued in the Wichita area and simulcast KSN's severe weather coverage.

HD Radio
In 2006, KZCH signed on HD Radio operations. On their HD 2 channel, the station carried Club Phusion. In 2011, it was replaced with modern rock, filling the void KANR left open when that station flipped to Spanish in 2006. In November 2012, 96.3 HD2 flipped back to dance, branded as "Evolution."  As of November 2022, 96.3 HD2 is now "Club Jam Christmas."

Notable Past & Present Personalities

Elvis Duran
Bobby Bones
Mat Mitchell in the Mornings
Big Head Ted
PJ
JoJo Collins
Brett Andrews
Spoon

References

External links
 Station website
 

ZCH
Contemporary hit radio stations in the United States
Radio stations established in 1978
IHeartMedia radio stations